In an internal combustion engine, the cylinder head (often abbreviated to simply "head") sits above the cylinders and forms the roof of the combustion chamber. In sidevalve engines, the head is a simple sheet of metal; whereas in more modern overhead valve and overhead camshaft engines, the cylinder head is a more complicated block often containing inlet and exhaust passages, coolant passages, valves, camshafts, spark plugs and fuel injectors. Most straight engines have a single cylinder head shared by all of the cylinders and most V engines have two cylinder heads (one per bank of cylinders).

Design 

A summary of engine designs is shown below, in chronological order for automobile usage.

Sidevalve engines 
In a flathead (sidevalve) engine, all of the valvetrain components are contained within the block, therefore the head is usually a simple sheet of metal bolted to the top of the engine block. Sidevalve engines were once universal in automobiles but are now largely obsolete in automobiles, aside from small engines such as lawnmowers, weed trimmers and chainsaws.

A later development called the intake over exhaust (IOE) engine, which combined elements of the sidevalve and overhead valve designs. Used extensively in American motorcycles in the early 1900s, the IOE engine remained in production in limited numbers until the 1990s. IOE engines are more efficient than sidevalve engines, but also more complex, larger and more expensive to manufacture.

Overhead valve & overhead camshaft engines 
In an overhead valve (OHV) or overhead camshaft (OHC) engine, a cylinder head consists of several passages (called ports); some of which form the path for intake gasses from the intake manifold to the combustion chamber, and the others are for exhaust gases to travel from combustion chamber to the exhaust manifold. The cylinder head also contains the valves and the spark plugs. 

Specifically in an OHV engine, a single camshaft is located within the engine block and uses pushrods and rocker arms to actuate valves. OHV engines are typically more compact than equivalent DOHC engines, however they have largely been replaced by DOHC designs, except in some American V8 engines.

In an overhead camshaft OHC design, the cylinder head contains the valves, spark plugs and inlet/exhaust tracts (as per an OHV engine), but the camshaft is now located in the cylinder head instead of the engine block. The camshaft may be seated centrally between each offset row of inlet and exhaust valves, and still also utilizing rocker arms (but without any pushrods), or the camshaft may be seated directly above the valves eliminating the rocker arms and utilizing 'bucket' tappets. OHC engines with a single camshaft per cylinder bank were widely used in automobiles in the 1960s to 1990s, with most designs using a rocker arm to actuate the valves on the opposite side of the engine to the camshaft. OHC engines with dual camshafts per cylinder bank (DOHC engines) have become widespread in modern automobile engines since the 1990s. DOHC engines allow optimum positioning of the valves for a crossflow cylinder head and direct actuation of valves (i.e. without rockers). They therefore generally allow for higher-RPM operations, however they are typically larger in size (especially width) than equivalent OHV or SOHC engines. 

For water-cooled OHV and OHC engines, the cylinder head also contains passages for the engine's coolant fluid, which is used to transfer heat away from the cylinder head.

Number of cylinder heads in an engine 
Most modern engines with a "straight" (inline) layout today use a single cylinder head that serves all the cylinders. Engines with a "V" layout or "flat" layout typically use two cylinder heads (one for each cylinder bank), however a small number of 'narrow-angle' V engines (such as the Volkswagen VR5 and VR6 engines use a single cylinder head spanning the two banks. Most radial engines have one head for each cylinder, although this is usually of the monobloc form wherein the head is made as an integral part of the cylinder. This is also common for motorcycles, and such head/cylinder components are referred to as barrels.

Some engines, particularly medium- and large-capacity diesel engines built for industrial, marine, power generation, and heavy traction purposes (large trucks, locomotives, heavy equipment, etc.) have individual cylinder heads for each cylinder. This reduces repair costs as a single failed head on a single cylinder can be changed instead of a larger, much more expensive unit fitting all the cylinders.  Such a design also allows engine manufacturers to easily produce a 'family' of engines of different layouts and/or cylinder numbers without requiring new cylinder head designs.

Gallery

See also 

 Crossflow cylinder head
 Head gasket
 Junk head
 Monobloc head

References

 
Engine technology